Nuttanon Kadchapanan (born 7 June 1993) is a tennis player from Thailand playing on the ATP Challenger Tour. On 30 September 2013, he reached his highest ATP singles ranking of 1213 and his highest doubles ranking of 392 achieved on 28 July 2014.

Tour titles

Doubles

External links
 

1993 births
Living people
Nuttanon Kadchapanan
Nuttanon Kadchapanan
Tennis players at the 2014 Asian Games
Tennis players at the 2018 Asian Games
Nuttanon Kadchapanan